The Toronto RCAF Hurricanes was a member of the Ontario Rugby Football Union and was formed during the Second World War after several teams disbanded for the war. The team was composed of football players who had joined the Royal Canadian Air Force. The team won the 30th Grey Cup in 1942.

Fifteen members of the team went on to operational service with the RCAF in Europe during the war. Seven of those men were killed in combat: Eddie Thompson, Lloyd Langley, Ed Poscavage, Eddie Burton, Jack Buckmaster, George Oliphant and Bob Sarvis.

1942 Grey Cup Line Up

QB – Bill Stukus
FW – Fred Kijek
HB – Eddie Thompson
HB – Jack Alexander
HB – Jack Perry
E  – Ed Poscavage
E  – Eddie Burton
C  – Jake Gaudaur
G – Paul McGarry
G – Lloyd Langley
T – Art Evans
T – Don Durno

Alternates: Don Crowe, John Buckmaster, Jack Taylor, Cece Foderingham, George Oliphant, Art West, Bob Sarvis, John Poplowsky, Charlie Prince, Victor S.(Red) Reynolds, Joey Richman, Jimmy Partridge

Coach: Lew Hayman

ORFU season-by-season

Notable players
Bill Stukus
Eddie Thompson
Fred Kijek
Bob Cosgrove
Jake Gaudaur

References

Ontario Rugby Football Union teams
RC
Defunct Canadian football teams
1942 establishments in Ontario
Sports clubs established in 1942
1943 disestablishments in Ontario
Sports clubs disestablished in 1943